Rizwana Syed Ali is a fiction writer from Pakistan. She has a long career as an author and has used her writings for creating awareness in the society.

Introduction 
Rizwana Syed Ali is known for her works in Urdu fiction. A short story-writer and a novelist, Rizwana entered the field as a young writer for children's magazines. Most of those who have grown up reading Urdu magazines Taleem-o-Tarbiat and Naunehal are familiar with her stories for children. Her fiction for kids and youngsters won her several awards including those from the National Book Foundation and Cambridge Educational.

Urdu afsana (short-story) was a genre Rizwana entered a few years later and was published in Urdu Digest, Chilman etc. In recent years the focus of her writings has entirely shifted to afsana and novel. Her first collection of afsana titled Nok-i-Qalam Pe Khar was published in 2003. Arranged in chronological order, this collection traced her career in afsana naveesi. Next in line was Peelay pholo ka noha a collection of 17 afsanas published in 2007.  Rizwana entered the world of novel writing in 2011 with the publication of Khwabgazeeda. One reviewer writes about her novel as:

The writer is deeply in touch with the conditions of her people and can cut right to the heart of their interactions. The vastness of characters makes the novel kaleidoscopic. … the scenes are beautifully constructed to depict the society in which characters live but the narrative dominates the novel instead of the characters. ... there is enough drama to embody emotions. ... Certainly it is the stagnation that has made the [Pakistani] society stink. Ali's progressive approach towards the issues shows us the tiny speck of light at the end of the tunnel. She reminds us that no matter how bleak the circumstances may be, it is never too late to take the initiative for change.

Another dimension to Rizwana’s work is her journalistic writings. She has been associated with the Urdu Dailies Islamabad Times, Ausaf and Subh as column-writer. 
Rizwana has always been a supporter of change through education in Pakistan. She has extensively written about the social disparities emanating from the stratified educational system in the country. In her research work on education, Seh Ranga Nizam-i-Taleem, she has argued that three systems of education that exist in Pakistan have damaged the society by deepening class differences. According to her, Pakistan's current education has set the society on a downward spiral instead of putting it on the path of development.

Fiction 
2011		Khwabgazeeda (Novel)
2007		Peelay Pholon Ka Noha (Short-stories Collection)
                                                                                   	
 Ferozsons Publishers, Lahore	

2003		Nok-i-Qalam pe Khar (Short-stories Collection)
		
Javedan Publishers, Islamabad

1995		Seh-Ranga Nizam-i-Taleem (Research)
		
 Jang Publishers, Lahore

Newspaper career 

Permanent Column Title: Nok-i-Qalam pe Khar

2009 Islamabad Times
2006–2007 Daily Ausaf Islamabad
2004–2006 Daily Subh Peshwar

Books for Children 

 Bachpan Jhaorokay se
 Abdul Ka Khawab
 Darna Nahi
 Ab Jang Na Ho
 Resham 
 Aik tha Jangal (3 vols)
 Ghommain Nagar Nagar
 Anokha Safar

References

External links 
 Na'at Competition
 National Book Foundation Book Fair

Pakistani writers
Living people
Urdu-language fiction writers
Year of birth missing (living people)